The women's handball tournament at the 2020 Summer Olympics was the 12th edition of the handball event for women at the Summer Olympic Games. It was held from 25 July to 8 August 2021. All games were played at the Yoyogi National Stadium in Tokyo, Japan.

It was originally scheduled to be held in 2020, but on 24 March 2020, the Olympics were postponed to 2021 due to the COVID-19 pandemic. Because of this pandemic, the games were played behind closed doors.

The final was a rematch of the previous between France and Russia. After Russia won 22–19 in the 2016 final France got the upper hand with a 30–25 win this time. Norway won the bronze medal after winning 36–19 against Sweden. France became the first nation since 1984 to win both the men's and women's tournaments

The medals for the competition were presented by Kristin Kloster Aasen, Norway; IOC Member, and the medalists' bouquets were presented by Anna Rapp, Sweden; IHF Treasurer.

Schedule
The schedule was as follows.

Qualification

Draw
The draw was held on 1 April 2021.

Seeding
The seeding was revealed on 21 March 2021.

Referees
The referee pairs were announced on 21 April 2021.

Rosters

Group stage
All times are local (UTC+9).

Group A

Group B

Knockout stage

Bracket

Quarterfinals

Semifinals

Bronze medal game

Gold medal game

Ranking and statistics

Final ranking

All Star Team
The all-star team was announced on 8 August 2021.

Top goalscorers

Source: IHF

Top goalkeepers

Source: IHF

Medalists

References

Women's tournament
Women's events at the 2020 Summer Olympics